Rhescuporis I was the Sapaean king of Thrace in 48-41 BC. He was the son of Cotys I.

Raskuporis Cove on Livingston Island in the South Shetland Islands, Antarctica is named after Rhescuporis I.

See also
 List of rulers of Thrace and Dacia

 
1st-century BC rulers in Europe
Thracian kings
Roman client rulers